Škoda 15Tr is an articulated trolleybus produced by Škoda Transportation from 1988 to 2004, since 1995 in modernized version 15TrM. It is a longer version of Škoda 14Tr.

Construction features 
An electric motor is located in the rear of the bus. Inside are used leatherette or plastic Vogelsitze seats. Rear B and C axles are propulsed. On the right side of the bus are four doors.

Production and operation

Škoda 15Tr 
Production of 15Tr started in 1988 and continued until 2004. 469 trolleybuses were produced and delivered to various cities in Czech Republic, Estonia, Hungary, Iran, Latvia, Lithuania, Slovakia, Ukraine.

Variations:
 Škoda 15Tr
 Škoda 15Tr02/6
 Škoda 15Tr02/7
 Škoda 15Tr03/6
 Škoda 15Tr07/6
 Škoda 15Tr07/7
 Škoda 15Tr08/6
 Škoda 15Tr09/7
 Škoda 15Tr10/7
 Škoda 15Tr11/7
 Škoda 15Tr12/6
 Škoda 15Tr13/6M
 Škoda 15Tr13/7M

Škoda 15TrSF 
15TrSF was in service in the United States until 2016, which was built by ETI for Muni public transit system in San Francisco, California, US.

Škoda 15Tr01 
Production of 15TrM started in 1995 and continued until 2005. 121 trolleybuses were produced and delivered to various cities in Czech Republic, Latvia and Slovakia.

Variations:
 Škoda 15TrMM

References

External links 
 Transphoto vehicle list page of Škoda 15TrM

See also 

Articulated buses
Buses of the Czech Republic
Trolleybuses
Škoda vehicles